Alphonse Emil "Tuffy" Leemans (November 12, 1912 – January 19, 1979) was an American professional football player who was a fullback and halfback who played on both offense and defense for the New York Giants of the National Football League (NFL). He was inducted into the Pro Football Hall of Fame in 1978 and was named in 1969 to the NFL 1930s All-Decade Team.

A native of Superior, Wisconsin, Leemans played college football for Oregon's freshman team in 1932 and for George Washington from 1933 to 1935. He was drafted by the Giants in the second round of the 1936 NFL Draft and played eight years for the Giants from 1936 to 1943.  He led the NFL as a rookie with 830 rushing yards and was selected as a first-team All-Pro in 1936 and 1939. He was also selected to play in the Pro Bowl in 1938 and 1941 and helped lead the Giants to the 1938 NFL Championship and the 1939 and 1941 NFL Championship Games.

After his playing career ended, Leemans worked briefly as a backfield coach for the Giants and at George Washington. He also operated a laundry and dry cleaning business and a duckpin bowling alley.

Early years
Leemans was born in 1912 in Superior, Wisconsin. His father Joseph Leemans (1887-1979) immigrated from Belgium in 1909 and worked as hoister for the Pittsburg Coal Co. on the coal dock in Superior. His mother Hortense (1897-1964) was born in Illinois, the daughter of Belgian immigrants. Leemans had three younger sisters Carolyn, Dorothy, and Doris. 

Leemans attended East High School in Superior. In his 1979 speech upon being inducted into the Pro Football Hall of Fame, Leemans recalled growing up in Superior: "I was a kid who used to work the iron ore boats on vacation from high school. I also worked as a fireman shoveling coal. But I was of hardy, Belgian stock and that early hard work helped me as a football player. I have achieved everything I ever wanted. I am a happy man."

Football career

College
In 1932, Leemans enrolled at the University of Oregon where he was a member of the freshman football team. He then transferred to George Washington University where he was the star of the George Washington Colonials football team from 1933 to 1935. In his three years at George Washington, he rushed for 2,382 yards on 490 carries for an average of 4.86 yards per carry. He also passed for 966 yards and returned 84 punts for 984 yards, an average of 11.7 yards per return.

New York Giants
Leemans was drafted by the New York Giants in the second round (18th overall pick) of the 1936 NFL Draft. Wellington Mara, son of Giants owner Tim Mara, saw Leemans play for George Washington and recommended to his father that the Giants sign him. Mara later said, "If I'm remembered for nothing else, I'd like to be remembered for discovering Tuffy Leemans."

In his first NFL season, Leemans played at the fullback position for the Giants and led the NFL with 830 rushing yards and an average of 69.2 rushing yards per game. He also impressed with his defensive play at the safety position.  He was the only rookie to be honored by the NFL as a first-team player on the 1936 All-Pro Team.  After the season ended, Leemans reported that he found it easier to make long gains in the NFL rather than college, citing better blocking in the professional ranks.

Following rumors that he intended to retire from professional football after one season, Leemans signed a contract in August 1937 to return to the Giants. During the 1937 season, Leemans did not have the same level of success as in 1936. Hank Soar took over as the Giants' leading rusher in 1937, and Leemans gained only 429 rushing yards, roughly half his total from the prior year. Despite the reduced offensive output, Leemans continued to garner credit for his overall play and was selected by the NFL and the New York Daily News as a second-team player on the 1937 All-Pro Team.

Leemans also played professional basketball during the off-season, joining the Heurich Brewers in Washington, D.C., after the 1937 NFL season.

Leemans continued to be one of the NFL's leading players, receiving either first- or second-team All-Pro honors every year from 1936 through 1942. He received first-team honors in 1936 and 1939 and second-team honors in each of the remaining years. He was also selected to play in the Pro Bowl in 1938 and 1941. He ranked second in the NFL in rushing yardage in 1938 with 463 yards and third in 1940 with 474 yards. He also helped lead the Giants to the 1938 NFL Championship as well as the 1939 and 1941 NFL Championship Games.

On December 7, 1941, the Giants celebrated "Tuffy Leemans Day," presenting him with a silver tray and $1,500 in defense bonds. The radio broadcast of the game on WOR was interrupted with an announcement of the Japanese attack on Pearl Harbor, and an urgent announcement was made at the Polo Grounds asking William J. Donovan (wartime head of the Office of Strategic Services) to call Operator 19 in Washington. However, most of the spectators and players at the Polo Grounds remained unaware of the attack until after the game.  Leemans' attempts to enlist in the Navy and Army during World War II were rejected on multiple occasions due to defective hearing in one ear caused by a concussion sustained in a football game as well as poor eyesight.

Leemans retired from football after the 1942 season. He signed on as a backfield coach with the Giants in 1943, but shortly before the season started, he opted to return as a player for one final year. He appeared in 10 games during the 1943 season, only one as a starter.  He retired again after the 1943 season.

Leemans appeared in 80 NFL games with the Giants from 1936 to 1943.  He totaled 3,132 rushing yards on 919 carries (3.4 yards per carry) and 17 rushing touchdowns, 2,318 passing yards and 25 passing touchdowns, 422 receiving yards on 28 receptions, and 339 yards on punt and kickoff returns.  Leemans also played on defense. Alex Wojciechowicz, a fellow Pro Football Hall of Fame inductee who played against Leemans, recalled: "Leemans was probably greater on defense than he was on offense. He was a bugger on defense, all over the field, always in on the action."

Coaching
After his playing career ended, Leemans continued for one year as the Giants' backfield coach in 1944. However, he retired from coaching in August 1945 to devote his time to his laundry business.

He returned to coaching in 1946 as the part-time backfield coach for the George Washington Colonials while continuing to operate his laundry and dry cleaning business.

Leemans also coached football at St. John's College High School and Archbishop Carroll High School, both in Washington, D. C.

Later years and honors  
In June 1937, after his great rookie season, Leemans married Theodora Rinaldi at St. Michael's Catholic Church in Silver Spring, Maryland. They remained married for 41 years (until Leemans' death) had two children, Joseph, who died in 1977, and Diane.

Leemans and his wife lived in Silver Spring, Maryland.  Leemans operated a duckpin bowling alley known as Tuffy Leemans' Glenmont Lanes. He also operated a laundry and dry cleaning business in the Washington, D. C., and Silver Spring dating back to and following his years as a football player. He was also active in the Washington D.C. Touchdown Club and was elected as the organization's president in 1956.

In 1969, Leemans was selected as one of the backs on the NFL 1930s All-Decade Team.

In 1978, Leemans was inducted into the Pro Football Hall of Fame. At the induction ceremony, he was introduced by his high school football coach Peter Guzy. In his speech, Leemans mentioned two of his teammates, Mel Hein, the Hall of Fame center, and Leland Shaffer, who Leemans credited as "my top blocker".

Leemans' weight rose in his later years to 300 pounds from his playing weight of 180 pounds. In January 1979, less than six months after his induction into the Hall of Fame, Leemans died from a heart attack at age 66 at his condominium in Hillsboro Beach, Florida.  He was interred at Gate of Heaven Cemetery in Silver Spring.

References

External links

 

1912 births
1979 deaths
American football fullbacks
American football halfbacks
American football quarterbacks
George Washington Colonials football players
George Washington Colonials football coaches
New York Giants players
New York Giants coaches
Oregon Ducks football players
National Football League players with retired numbers
Pro Football Hall of Fame inductees
Sportspeople from Superior, Wisconsin
Players of American football from Wisconsin
American people of Belgian descent
Burials at Gate of Heaven Cemetery (Silver Spring, Maryland)